Twigson (original title: Knerten) is a Norwegian film from 2009 directed by Åsleik Engmark, based on the children's books by author Anne-Cath. Vestly. The movie entered Norwegian cinemas on 16 October 2009.

Plot
Lillebror has recently moved from Oslo and out to the countryside with his big brother Phillip and his parents. Once there, he realizes that there is nobody to make friends with. One day, all that changes when his imagination brings him a friend—the stick figure Knerten appears in a pile of wood. While Lillebror's mother is at work and his father is busy traveling, selling underwear, Lillebror has to take care of himself, together with his new friend, Knerten.

Cast and characters
 Adrian Grønnevik Smith as Lillebror
 Åsleik Engmark as Twigson (voice)
 Jan Gunner Røise as Lillebror's father
 Pernille Sørensen as Lillebror's mother
 Petrus A. Christensen as big brother Phillip
 Amalie Blankholm Heggemsnes as Vesla
 Per Schaanning as Eilertsen
 Kjersti Fjeldstad as Aunt Roundabout
 Per Jansen as the builder
 Lisa Loven Kongsli as movie star Vivian Løkkeberg
 John Brungot as the bus driver
 Jan-Paul Brekke as mover man #1
 Magnus Devold as mover man #2
 Amalie Sveen Ulven as Marie
 Ole Johan Skjelbred-Knutsen as Vesla's father
 Silje Torp as Carolina

References

External links
 

2009 films
Norwegian children's films
Films based on children's books
2000s Norwegian-language films
Norwegian comedy films